Barg-e Najaf (also Romanized as Barg-e Najaft; also known as Najaft) is a village in Gerit Rural District, Papi District, Khorramabad County, Lorestan Province, Iran. At the 2006 census, its population was 122, across 23 families.

References 

Towns and villages in Khorramabad County